Shoemaker Hill is a summit located in Central New York Region of New York located in the Town of German Flatts in Herkimer County, east of Mohawk.

References

Mountains of Herkimer County, New York
Mountains of New York (state)